The Kei goby (Oxyurichthys keiensis) is a species of goby native to marine and brackish waters along the coasts of Mozambique, South Africa, Madagascar and the Seychelles. This species can reach a length of  TL.

Sources

Kei goby
Fish of Mozambique
Marine fauna of East Africa
Near threatened animals
Taxa named by J. L. B. Smith
Kei goby
Taxonomy articles created by Polbot
Taxobox binomials not recognized by IUCN